The 2019 Heartland Championship, known as the 2019 Mitre 10 Heartland Championship for sponsorship reasons, was the 14th edition of the Heartland Championship, a rugby union competition involving the twelve amateur rugby unions in New Zealand. The tournament began with a round-robin stage in which the twelve teams played eight games each, from which the top four advanced to the Meads Cup semifinals, while fifth to eighth advanced to the Lochore Cup semifinals. In both of these knockout stages the top seeds (first and fifth) played at home against the lowest seeds (fourth and eighth), the second highest seeds (second and sixth) played at home against the third highest seeds (third and seventh) and the final featured the higher seed playing at home against the lower seed.

Teams 

The 2019 Heartland Championship was contested by the following teams.

Standings

In the case of a two-team tie on points the ranking of teams is decided by:
 (1) the winner of the round robin match between the two provinces; then 
 (2) highest point difference; then 
 (3) most tries scored; then 
 (4) a coin toss.
In the caseof a three-team or more tie on points the ranking of teams is decided by:
 (1) the province with the most wins against other tied provinces in the Round Robin; then 
 (2) if two teams remain tied they shall be ranked according to the criteria listed above, but if more than two teams remain tied, they shall be ranked according to criteria (2) to (4) only.

Regular season
The schedule of fixtures was confirmed on 25 February 2019.

Round 1

Round 2

Round 3

Round 4

Round 5

Round 6

Round 7

Round 8

Finals

Semi-finals

Finals

Ranfurly Shield

Pre-season challenges
For the 2019 preseason Ranfurly Shield holders Otago saw challenges from the reigning 2018 Heartland Championship champions Thames Valley as well as neighbours North Otago.

See also

2019 Mitre 10 Cup
Heartland Championship
Ranfurly Shield 2010–2019
New Zealand Heartland XV

References

External links
Official website of the Heartland Championship

Heartland Championship
Heartland
Heartland